The USAS application suite is a series of diverse and relatively complex mainframe applications written for the Unisys 1100-series, 2200-series, and Clearpath IX environments.  These applications are generally intended for use in the airline, transportation, and hospitality industries.

Older USAS applications such as USAS*RES (Reservations System) or USAS*FDC (Flight Data Control) were written originally in Fortran, but elements of various applications were also written in COBOL, Unisys 1100/2200 assembly language (ASM or MASM), and the LINC 4GL.

USAS application mainly developed for Airlines business use. There were many applications in USAS suite. Check-In, Reservation, Cargo operations are the main suites. Lufthansa IT systems plays a major role in developing USAS suite.

Most (if not all) USAS applications are written as text-based online transaction systems which are designed for low overhead and fast response times.  The environment most commonly used is HVTIP (short for High-Volume TIP).

The original USAS applications such as USAS*RES (Reservation System), USAS*CGO (Cargo Application) was written in the early 70s and were adapted in different forms in varying degrees of customization.

With recent advancements in computing technology however, the USAS line of products is slowly diminishing and is being replaced (especially in the Airline industry) with other open source front-end products.

"USAS" was originally an acronym for Univac Standard Airline Systems, but the product line is now referred to simply as "USAS".

Current Users
Unisys Cargo Hosting Services, Minneapolis :: Delta Cargo, Air Canada Cargo
Air Iberia
Travel Sky, China
Amadeus
NorthWest (cargo)
Cathay Pacific
Qantas Airways
Air India

See also
List of UNIVAC products
History of computing hardware

Business software
Fortran software
UNIVAC software